Vinarje is a settlement in the Municipality of Slovenska Bistrica in northeastern Slovenia. The area is part of the traditional region of Styria. It is now included with the rest of the municipality in the Drava Statistical Region.

The local church is dedicated to Saint Josse and belongs to the Parish of Prihova. It dates to the 16th century with 17th-century additions.

References

External links
Vinarje at Geopedia

Populated places in the Municipality of Slovenska Bistrica